Raneem El-Gedawy (born February 24, 1997) is an Egyptian basketball player. She plays professionally for Al Ahly women's team and the Egypt women's national basketball team.

College
El-Gedawy was a student of Western Kentucky University. During her freshman season, she averaged nine points and 7.1 rebounds with 42 total blocks and 30 steals. She became the first player to capture "C-USA Freshman of the Year honors".  She was named "C-USA Freshman of the Week" four times, while becoming the first WKU player to be honored as the "USBWA National Freshman of the Week".

As a sophomore El-Gedawy started out all 35 games and finished the season with six double-double performances. As a junior she averaged 17.6 points per game, a double-double with 11.0 rebounds per game. She made history by becoming the 41st Lady Topper in the 1,000 Point Club and ended the season with 1,346 career points which ranks as the 23rd.

In her senior year, El-Gedawy played in 16 games, scored in double figures in all games and averaged 20.9 points per game, and 12.1 rebounds.

National team career
El-Gedawy has represented her nation in several international competitions competing in the FIBA World Championships, the Fiba Women's Afrobasket.

References

1997 births
Living people
Western Kentucky Lady Toppers basketball players
Egyptian women's basketball players
Egyptian expatriate sportspeople in the United States
Egyptian expatriate basketball people in the United States